Hamed Traorè (born 16 February 2000) is an Ivorian professional footballer who plays as a central midfielder for Premier League club Bournemouth, on loan from Sassuolo. He represents the Ivory Coast national team.

Early life 
Born in Abidjan, Ivory Coast, Traorè moved to Italy at a young age.

Club career

Empoli
Traorè made his Serie B debut for Empoli on 8 October 2017 in a game against Foggia. On 26 August 2018, he made his debut in Serie A in the defeat against Genoa, substituting Zajc the 85th minute.

On 15 January 2019, Fiorentina agreed a deal to sign Traorè with him remaining on loan at Empoli for the remainder of the season. However, at the end of the season, Empoli chairman Fabrizio Corsi announced the deal had fallen through.

Sassuolo
On 12 July 2019, Traorè joined Sassuolo on a two-year loan with an option to buy.

Bournemouth 
On 31 January 2023, Traorè joined AFC Bournemouth. The deal is structured as an initial loan with a subsequent permanent transfer and a five-year contract.

International career
Traorè debuted for the Ivory Coast U23s in a pair of 2019 Africa U-23 Cup of Nations qualification matches in March 2019.

He made his debut for the Ivory Coast national team on 6 September 2021 in a World Cup qualifier against Cameroon, a 2–1 home victory. He substituted Jérémie Boga in the 69th minute.

Personal life 
In July 2020, an investigation into trafficking of football players was launched by the public prosecutor's office of Parma. Among the involved was Hamed Mamadou Traorè, a distant relative of Hamed and his alleged brother Amad Diallo, who was accused of posing as their father to facilitate their immigration to Italy. The investigation also questioned the relationship between Hamed and Amad.

On 10 February 2021, Traorè was found guilty of violating the Italian Sports Justice Code in order to join the football club "ASD Boca Barco" in 2015 under the name "Hamed Junior Traorè". He was accused of falsifying documents in order to fake a relationship with Hamed Mamadou Traorè, an Ivorian citizen resident in Italy, and request a family reunification. Traorè requested a plea bargain, with the Federal Prosecutor's Office imposing a fine of €48,000.

Career statistics

Club

International

Honours
Ivory Coast U23
 Africa U-23 Cup of Nations runner-up: 2019

References

External links
 

2000 births
Ivorian emigrants to Italy
Living people
Footballers from Abidjan
Association football midfielders
Ivorian footballers
Ivory Coast under-20 international footballers
Ivory Coast international footballers
Empoli F.C. players
U.S. Sassuolo Calcio players
AFC Bournemouth players
Serie B players
Serie A players
2021 Africa Cup of Nations players
Ivorian expatriate footballers
Expatriate footballers in Italy
Ivorian expatriate sportspeople in Italy
Expatriate footballers in England
Ivorian expatriate sportspeople in England